Ajay Wardhan is an upcoming Indian Hindi-language biographical drama film directed by Pragathi Agarwal & Amit Aseem. The films stars Romil Chaudhary, Arjumman Mughal, Ruslaan Mumtaz and Aham Sharma in lead roles. The fight sequence was coordinated by Vijay Cheera.

Cast 
 Romil Chaudhary as Dr. Ajay Wardhan
 Abhimanyu Aryan as Junior Ajay wardhan
 Pihu Sharma as Dr. Pragati Agarwal, Ajay's enduring love interest
 Kshitij Patwardhan as Vijay Kumar, Ajay's elder brother
 Yogesh Vatts as Little Vijay
 Aman Bhogal as Radha Devi, Ajay's Mother
 Ravi as Ramnath Ji, Ajay's Father
 Dimple Bagroy as Rashmi Agarwal, Pragati's Mother
 Girish Thapar as Manoj Kumar, Pragati's Father
 Dr. Nikita Sabarwal as Journalist
 Ruslaan Mumtaz
 Arjumman Mughal
 Aham Sharma
 Priya Sharma
 Aishwarya Raj Bhakuni
 Rashiprabha Sandeepani

Plot
The film revolves around the life journey of a famous dental surgeon from Chandigarh, named Dr Ajay Aryan. The film shows how difficulties Dr Ajay Aryan get in achieving his goal. His journey from gazing sheeps and goats in his small village to become the famous dental surgeon is being shown in the film.

Soundtrack 
The Music and background score were composed by Monty Sharma, the first collaboration with Prasidh Eklavya Entertainment. The soundtrack features eight songs with lyrics penned by Dr. Ajay Aryan.

Track list

References

External links 
 

2022 films
Indian drama films
2020s Hindi-language films